In coding theory, the Preparata codes form a class of non-linear double-error-correcting codes.  They are named after Franco P. Preparata who first described them in 1968.

Although non-linear over GF(2) the Preparata codes are linear over Z4 with the Lee distance.

Construction
We first describe the extended Preparata code of length : the Preparata code is then derived by deleting one position. The words of the extended code are regarded as pairs (X, Y) of 2m-tuples, each corresponding to subsets of the finite field GF(2m) in some fixed way.

The extended code contains the words (X, Y) satisfying three conditions

 X, Y each have even weight;
 
 

The Preparata code is obtained by deleting the position in X corresponding to 0 in GF(2m).

Properties
The Preparata code is of length 2m+1 − 1, size 2k where k = 2m + 1 − 2m − 2, and minimum distance 5.

When m = 3, the Preparata code of length 15 is also called the Nordstrom–Robinson code.

References 
 
 
 http://www.encyclopediaofmath.org/index.php/Preparata_code
 http://www.encyclopediaofmath.org/index.php/Kerdock_and_Preparata_codes

Error detection and correction
Finite fields
Coding theory